Waikuku Beach is a small settlement on the coast of the Canterbury region of New Zealand, about  east of the settlement of Waikuku. 

The sandy beach is popular with surfers and swimmers, and the large estuary of the Ashley River hosts many species of birds. The Waikuku beach has been rated as one of the ten best to learn to surf at.

Demographics
It is part of the wider Waikuku statistical area.

Waikuku Beach had a population of 912 at the 2018 New Zealand census, an increase of 12 people (1.3%) since the 2013 census, and an increase of 54 people (6.3%) since the 2006 census. There were 342 households. There were 468 males and 444 females, giving a sex ratio of 1.05 males per female, with 168 people (18.4%) aged under 15 years, 141 (15.5%) aged 15 to 29, 477 (52.3%) aged 30 to 64, and 126 (13.8%) aged 65 or older.

Ethnicities were 95.4% European/Pākehā, 13.2% Māori, 1.3% Pacific peoples, 1.0% Asian, and 1.6% other ethnicities.

Although some people objected to sharing their religion, 62.2% had no religion, 28.3% were Christian, 0.3% were Muslim and 1.3% had other religions.

Of those at least 15 years old, 147 (19.8%) people had a bachelor or higher degree, and 144 (19.4%) people had no formal qualifications. The employment status of those at least 15 was that 402 (54.0%) people were employed full-time, 132 (17.7%) were part-time, and 18 (2.4%) were unemployed.

Notes

References

Populated places in Canterbury, New Zealand
Waimakariri District